Rodrigo Nahuel Amaral Pereira (born 25 March 1997) is a Uruguayan professional footballer who plays as a forward for Bolivian Primera División club The Strongest.

Prior to arriving at Racing, he was at Nacional, where he started his career, but left the club due to differences with management.

Honours

Club 
Nacional
 Uruguayan Primera División: 2014–15, 2016

International 
Uruguay U20
 South American Youth Football Championship: 2017

References

External links 
 
 http://www.lr21.com.uy/deportes/1323078-rodrigo-amaral-se-pone-a-punto-con-andres-barrios
 http://www.referi.uy/amaral-no-vuelve-nacional-n1059004

1997 births
Living people
Footballers from Montevideo
Association football forwards
Uruguayan footballers
Uruguay youth international footballers
Uruguay under-20 international footballers
2015 South American Youth Football Championship players
Uruguayan Primera División players
Argentine Primera División players
Bolivian Primera División players
Club Nacional de Football players
Racing Club de Avellaneda footballers
Club Atlético Fénix players
The Strongest players
Uruguayan expatriate footballers
Uruguayan expatriate sportspeople in Argentina
Uruguayan expatriate sportspeople in Bolivia
Expatriate footballers in Argentina
Expatriate footballers in Bolivia